Alson is a given name. Notable people with the name include:

Alson (horse) (foaled 13 February 2017) is a German-bred thoroughbred racehorse
Alson S. Clark (1876–1949), American Impressionist painter best remembered for his landscapes
Jacob Alson Long (1846–1923), prominent lawyer in Graham, North Carolina
Alson Sherman (1811–1903), served as mayor of Chicago (1844–1845), for the Independent Democrat Party
Alson Streeter (1823–1901), of New Windsor, Illinois, the Union Labor Party nominee in the United States presidential election of 1888
Alson Weber (1910–2005), Canadian volleyball player
Alson Wood (1828–1904), American politician